The French Union was a political entity created by the French Fourth Republic to replace the old French colonial empire system, colloquially known as the "French Empire". It was the formal end of the "indigenous" status of French subjects in colonial areas.

Composition

The French Union had five components:
 Metropolitan France, which included French Algeria.
 'Old' colonies, notably those of the French West Indies in the Caribbean that became overseas departments in 1946: Guadeloupe, French Guiana, Martinique, Réunion.
 'New' colonies, renamed overseas territories: Ivory Coast, Dahomey, Guinea, Mauritania, Niger, Senegal, French Sudan, Upper Volta, Congo, Gabon, Ubangi-Shari, Chad, Comoros, French India, Madagascar, New Caledonia, French Polynesia, Saint Pierre and Miquelon, French Somaliland.
 Associated states: Protectorates of French Indochina. It had been expected that other protectorates would become part of the French Union, but the rulers of French Morocco and French Tunisia refused to become members and never belonged.
 United Nations Trust Territories, such as French Cameroons and French Togoland, successors of the League of Nations mandates.

History
The French Union was established by the French constitution of 27 October 1946 (Fourth Republic). Under it, it was said that there were no French colonies, but that metropolitan France, the overseas departments, and the overseas territories combined to create a single French Union, or just one France.

The goal of this union was "assimilation of the overseas territories into a greater France, inhabited by French citizens, and blessed by French culture". Whereas the British colonial system had local colonial governments which would eventually evolve into separate national governments; France wanted to create a single government under a single French state.

This French Union had a President, a High Council and an Assembly. The President was the President of the Republic. The Assembly of the Union had membership from the Council of the Republic, from the National Assembly and from regional assemblies of the overseas territories and departments but ultimately had no power. The High Council ultimately met only three times, first in 1951. The Assembly was the only actually functioning institution that could manage legislation within the overseas territories.

In reality, the colonial areas had representation but all power remained in the French Parliament and thus was centralized. The colonies had local assemblies but these had only limited local power.

On 31 January 1956, in response to the Algerian War, the system changed, abandoning assimilation in favor of autonomy, allowing territories to develop their own local government and to eventually gain their independence. This would not succeed however and in 1958 the French Union was replaced by the French Community by Charles de Gaulle's Fifth Republic wherein France was now a federation of states with their own self-government.

Contemporary views on the French Union 
The limited democratic reforms and increased investment in the French colonies brought about by the formation of the French Union did receive some support from African leaders at the time. For instance, Félix Houphouet-Boigny, at the time a member of the French National Assembly, was very supportive of France’s investment in Cote d’Ivoire through the Central Fund for France Overseas, which disbursed over 600Bn Francs to French colonies. He was also supportive of the greater democratic freedoms that were granted to Africans within the Union, such as new elected territorial assemblies.

Leopold Senghor was similarly supportive of the French Union, and after visiting Cote d’Ivoire in 1952, believed that cooperation between France and its colony was mutually beneficial and that such French assistance should be “extended…to all the territories of the Federation”.

Yet more support for the French Union came from French Togoland, now Togo, where in June 1955 the locally elected Territorial Assembly voted unanimously on a motion to remain within France’s sphere of influence.

On the other hand, there did exist popular resistance to the French Union. According to Louisa Rice, the increase in the number of African students being educated in France following the Union’s formation resulted in a realisation among them of the contradiction between the colonial narrative of equality and reality, thus heightening resistance to its supposedly egalitarian institutions. A concrete example of this resistance occurred on Bastille Day 1952, when a group of West African students returning home by ship were excluded from celebrations due to them travelling in third class. The students argued that they were discriminated against because of their race, yet the ship’s captain viewed these allegations with surprise, thinking that their exclusion was merely due to the ship’s “interior order which had nothing to do with racist theories”. This example is a microcosm of differing contemporary opinions of the French Union. On the one hand there is a view that all citizens of the Union, be they French or African, are equal and are treated as such. On the other, that it was institutionally exclusionary towards Africans, and that despite ostensible changes, the French Union was merely a continuation of colonialism under a new guise.

Furthermore, there was a view among French officials that the French Union constituted an important part of a wider European economic and political project, that is, the European Economic Community (EEC). Indeed, according to Peo Hansen and Stefan Jonsson, at the genesis of the EEC, the integration of Africa into the economic bloc was an important strategic goal for its architects and supporters.

One of these supporters, French Foreign Minister Christian Pineau, said in 1957 that the continued development of Africa by Europe would turn the continent into “an essential factor in world politics”, and the alleviation of poverty would help to ward off communist influence. Here we can see that the French Union was viewed by the French government as a useful tool to both consolidate European economic integration and fight the Cold War.

The model of the EEC was also used by African leaders to justify their countries’ continued membership of the French Union. For instance, Houphouet-Boigny wrote in 1957 that by “relinquish[ing] a part of their sovereignty”, European countries would bring about “a more fully elaborated form of civilization which is more advantageous for their peoples” that goes beyond backward nationalism. Senghor echoes this view, arguing that “it would be pointless to cultivate particularism in Africa”, and that instead there should be a goal to remove borders entirely, forming a large economic/political bloc. Here we can see a view that greater integration into economic and political blocs, such as the French Union and the EEC, was viewed by both French officials and some African leaders as progressive, forward thinking, and within their interests to do so.

Withdrawals from the French Union
 Cambodia withdrew on 25 September 1955.
 South Vietnam withdrew on 9 December 1955.
 Laos withdrew on 11 May 1957 by amending its constitution.

Youth Council 

The Youth Council of the French Union (abbreviated CJUF) was a coordinating body of youth organizations in the French Union. CJUF was founded in 1950. The organization had its headquarters in Paris and held annual congresses.

Aftermath of the French Union and the French Community 
In 1958, the French Fourth Republic was replaced by a new Fifth Republic, characterised by a stronger presidential system, led by President Charles De Gaulle. A constitutional referendum was held on 28 September 1958 , in order to replace the French Union, as part of a wider referendum across the French Union (and France itself) on whether to adopt the new French Constitution; if accepted, colonies would become part of the new French Community; if rejected, the territory would be granted independence.

All major political parties in each respective country apart from two in Guinea and Niger, supported a yes vote in the 1958 constitutional referendum, seeking a looser form of autonomy rather than the system of close relations dominated by French influence.

The referendum proposal was overwhelmingly approved by upward of 90% of the population in most but not all of the territories.  Even in Niger, where the main organised political force opposed the replacing of the French Union with the French Community, the new constitution was supported by a clear majority. However in Guinea, where the leading political activists preferred immediate and complete independence, the results showed that more than 95% of voters voted against the constitution, with a turnout of 85.5%.

In response to the result in Guinea, French officials destroyed furniture, lightbulbs and windows. Any crockery, medical equipment or documents that could not be carried were also destroyed and over 3,000 French civil servants and army health officials left the country.  This only reinforced anti colonial sentiment inside of Guinea, and Toure would continue to urge other African nations to declare independence.

The former west and central African colonies after the passage of the referendum formed a short-lived organisation in 1959 called the Union of Central African Republics, replacing the bloc of French Equatorial Africa that existed as a subsection of the French Union and became part of the new French Community.

Within metropolitan France itself, most political parties supported the proposed changes to the constitution, most significantly those of ascendant Charles De Gaulle as well as the majority of the SFIO. Notable opposing forces were the French Communist Party as well as a smaller section of socialists that included the future President of France, Francois Mitterrand. Opposition to the changes were split between those who wanted complete independence for the African former colonies, mainly those on the French left and then those who opposed any change to the existing system of the French union at all, mostly positioned on the right.

De Gaulle successfully argued that his position on creating a French Community as opposed to the continuance of the French Union, as a sensible and moderate compromise. However, the new French Community did not last long, with most African states leaving the organisation by 1962, preferring complete independence.  The French Constitution was changed to remove any mention of the French Community in the 1990s. The Organisation Internationale de la Francophonie is based on promotion of the French language, and includes states and parts of states which were not part of the French Union in 1946 or 1958, or in some cases never French colonies or protectorates.

See also
CEFEO
Decolonization
First Indochina War
Françafrique
French colonial empire
French Community

References

Further reading
 Cooper, Frederick. "French Africa, 1947–48: Reform, Violence, and Uncertainty in a Colonial Situation." Critical Inquiry  (2014) 40#4 pp: 466–478. in JSTOR
 Simpson, Alfred William Brian. Human Rights and the End of Empire: Britain and the Genesis of the European Convention (Oxford University Press, 2004).
 Smith, Tony. "A comparative study of French and British decolonization." Comparative Studies in Society and History (1978) 20#1 pp: 70-102. online 
 Smith, Tony. "The French Colonial Consensus and People's War, 1946–58." Journal of Contemporary History (1974): 217–247. in JSTOR

 
French colonial empire
Overseas France
Defunct organizations based in France
Former international organizations
French West Africa
French Equatorial Africa
French Indochina
French India
French Togoland

States and territories established in 1946
States and territories disestablished in 1958
1946 establishments in France
1958 disestablishments in France
1946 establishments in the French colonial empire
1958 disestablishments in the French colonial empire